In number theory, the Hasse norm theorem states that if L/K is a cyclic extension of number fields, then if a nonzero element of K is a local norm everywhere, then it is a global norm.

The theorem is no longer true in general if the extension is abelian but not cyclic. Hasse gave the counterexample that 3 is a local norm everywhere for the extension  but is not a global norm. Serre and Tate showed that another counterexample is given by the field  where every rational square is a local norm everywhere but  is not a global norm.

This is an example of a theorem stating a local-global principle. 

The Hasse norm theorem can be deduced from the theorem that an element of the Galois cohomology group H2(L/K) is trivial if it is trivial locally everywhere, which is in turn equivalent to the deep theorem that the first cohomology of the idele class group vanishes. This is true for all finite Galois extensions of number fields, not just cyclic ones. For cyclic extensions the group  H2(L/K) is isomorphic to the Tate cohomology group H0(L/K) which describes which elements are norms, so for cyclic extensions it becomes Hasse's theorem that an element is a norm if it is a local norm everywhere.

See also

Grunwald–Wang theorem, about when an element that is a power everywhere locally is a power.

References

 H. Hasse, "A history of class field theory", in J.W.S. Cassels and A. Frohlich (edd), Algebraic number theory, Academic Press, 1973.  Chap.XI.
 G. Janusz, Algebraic number fields, Academic Press, 1973.  Theorem V.4.5, p. 156

Class field theory
Theorems in algebraic number theory